Pike River may refer to:

Places 
Pike River, South Australia, a locality in the Renmark Paringa Council
Pike River Conservation Park, a protected area in South Australia
 Pike River, Quebec, Canada, a municipality (formerly known as Saint-Pierre-de-Véronne-à-Pike-River)
 Pike River, Wisconsin, United States, an unincorporated community

Rivers

Australia
 Pike River (South Australia)

Canada
 Pike River (British Columbia), see list of rivers of British Columbia
 Pike River (Quebec), see Lake Carmi

United States
 Pike River (Michigan)
 Pike River (Minnesota)
 Pike River (Menominee River), in Wisconsin

Other uses 
 Pike River Mine, New Zealand
Pike River Coal
Pike River Mine disaster of November 2010